Selviytyjät Suomi (season 4) is the fourth season of the Finnish reality show Selviytyjät Suomi based on the Swedish reality series Expedition Robinson. This season, eight celebrities face off against eight ordinary Finns for 32 days in Caramoan, Philippines, to try to avoid being voted off and to be the last one standing and claim €30,000 and the title of Sole Survivor. The season aired from 8 September 2019 and concluded on 15 December the same year when Kai Fagerlund won against Viivi Vaattovaara in a 5–4 jury vote and became the first non-celebrity since 2013 to claim the title of Sole Survivor.

Finishing order

Notes

References

Externtal links

2019 Finnish television seasons
Survivor Finland seasons